Richard Pryor: Live in Concert is a 1979 American stand-up comedy film starring Richard Pryor and directed by Jeff Margolis.

Production
The film was shot at the Terrace Theatre in Long Beach, California on December 10, 1978. It was produced and distributed independently, and was the first full-length feature movie consisting of only stand-up comedy. The double album Wanted: Live in Concert was recorded at other dates during the same tour, and features much of the same material included in the film.

Accolades

Reception and legacy
In her review of Richard Pryor Live in Concert, Pauline Kael commented, "Probably the greatest of all recorded-performance films. Pryor had characters and voices bursting out of him .... Watching this mysteriously original physical comedian you can't account for his gift and everything he does seems to be for the first time." Eddie Murphy has called it "the single greatest stand-up performance ever captured on film."

In 2021, the film was selected for preservation in the United States National Film Registry by the Library of Congress as being "culturally, historically, or aesthetically significant".

References

External links 
 

1979 films
1979 comedy films
African-American comedy films
American comedy films
Films set in Long Beach, California
Films with screenplays by Richard Pryor
Richard Pryor
Stand-up comedy concert films
United States National Film Registry films
1970s English-language films
1970s American films